Elaeocarpus miriensis is a species of flowering plant in the Elaeocarpaceae family. It is a tree endemic to Borneo.

References

miriensis
Endemic flora of Borneo
Trees of Borneo
Vulnerable plants
Taxonomy articles created by Polbot
Plants described in 1975